The St. Louis Cardinals are a Major League Baseball (MLB) franchise whose players sport jerseys with the famous birds on the bat and interlocking StL logos.  The Cardinals first got their name in 1900 from the cardinal red trim on their uniforms and adopted the image of the cardinal birds perched on the bat in 1922. Since then, the uniforms have consistently retained the birds theme while undergoing noticeable modification of both the portrayal and "Cardinals" and "St. Louis" script interchangeably used.

Cap logos

References

St. Louis Cardinals
Cardinals